Major-General Sir William Julius Gascoigne  (29 May 1844 – 9 September 1926) was a British Army officer and served as General Officer Commanding the Militia of Canada from 1895 to 1898.

Military career
Gascoigne was commissioned into the Scots Fusilier Guards in 1863. He was appointed Adjutant in 1867, served in Egypt in 1882 and in Sudan in 1885

In 1895 he was promoted to Major-general and appointed General Officer Commanding the Militia of Canada and in 1898 he was appointed Commander of British Troops in China and Hong Kong.

Gascoigne was also the last Lieutenant Governor of Hong Kong (serving from 1898 to 1902), but the role was ceremonial and in lapsed use since the 1870s.

He was appointed a Companion of the Order of St Michael and St George (CMG) in 1899, and knighted as a Knight Commander (KCMG) of the same order in Nov 1900 in recognition of services during the Boxer Rebellion in China.

Gascoigne Road in Kowloon, Hong Kong is named after him.

Family
In 1875, he married Helen Smith, daughter of Martin T. Smith, and widow of Hon. Arthur F. Egerton.

References

|-

1844 births
1926 deaths
British Army major generals
Knights Commander of the Order of St Michael and St George
Scots Guards officers
Commanders of the Canadian Army
British Army personnel of the Anglo-Egyptian War
British Army personnel of the Mahdist War
British military personnel of the Boxer Rebellion